Bogdan Turudija (born 30 June 1948) is a former Yugoslav and Serbian footballer who played as a midfielder.

Career
Born in Loznica, Turudija moved to Belgrade with his family as an infant. He started playing at OFK Beograd, making his senior debut in 1966. Over the next decade, Turudija amassed over 250 appearances in the Yugoslav First League. He also played over 20 games with the Romantičari in the UEFA Cup. In late 1976, Turudija went abroad to France and spent one year with Troyes. He then switched to fellow French club Entente BFN during the 1977–78 season.

In 1978, Turudija moved to the United States at the invitation of Milan Mandarić and joined the Oakland Stompers of the North American Soccer League. He rejoined OFK Beograd for two months during the off-season, before returning to the NASL to play for the Edmonton Drillers, newly relocated from Oakland. Between 1979 and 1982, Turudija spent three seasons with Belgian side UR Namur.

References

External links
 
 

Association football midfielders
Edmonton Drillers (1979–1982) players
Expatriate footballers in Belgium
Expatriate footballers in France
Expatriate soccer players in Canada
Expatriate soccer players in the United States
Ligue 1 players
Ligue 2 players
North American Soccer League (1968–1984) players
Oakland Stompers players
OFK Beograd players
Serbian footballers
Sportspeople from Loznica
ES Troyes AC players
Union Royale Namur Fosses-La-Ville players
Yugoslav expatriate footballers
Yugoslav expatriate sportspeople in Belgium
Yugoslav expatriate sportspeople in Canada
Yugoslav expatriate sportspeople in France
Yugoslav expatriate sportspeople in the United States
Yugoslav First League players
Yugoslav footballers
1948 births
Living people